Cosmopolitan Club may refer to:
Cosmopolitan Club (Chennai), golf course in India
Cosmopolitan Club (Coimbatore), club in India
Cosmopolitan Club (London), club active 1852–1902 in England
Cosmopolitan Club (New York City), private club in United States
Cosmopolitan Club of Philadelphia, women's club in United States
Cosmopolitan Club (rugby), French rugby club for which Gaston Lane (1883–1914) played

See also
 List of Cosmopolitan Clubs for information about other organisations of the same name